The singles discography of American Jazz artist Sarah Vaughan contains 89 singles, two promotional singles and seven other charted songs. Vaughan recorded her first singles in 1946, with her first release being "If You Could See Me Now". Soon after, she her first major chart success on the Billboard pop list with "Tenderly" and "It's Magic." Moving to Columbia Records, she had further pop hits in the late 1940s with covers of "Black Coffee" and "Nature Boy." She had her second top ten hit in 1950 with "(I Love the Girl) I Love the Guy." Vaughan moved to Mercury Records during the 1950s and recorded more pop music. At Mercury, she had her biggest chart success, with the top ten hits "Make Yourself Comfortable" and "Whatever Lola Wants." In 1959, Vaughan's single "Broken Hearted Melody" reached number seven on the Billboard pop chart and became an international success, becoming the biggest single of her career. 

Vaughan had further pop chart entries into the 1960s with "Eternally" and "Serenata." She then moved to Roulette Records. At Roulette, she recorded a handful of singles, including "Bluesette," which was her first to chart on the Billboard adult contemporary survey. She followed this with "A Lover's Concerto," which reached the top ten of the same chart. The song also was her final release to chart on the pop chart, reaching the top 70. Vaughan continued releasing singles through various record labels into the 1980s. Her 1974 release, "I Need You More (Than Ever Now)" was her final charting release.

Singles

1946–1956

1957–1987

Promotional singles

Other charted songs

Notes

References

External links
 Sarah Vaughan Discography at Discogs
 The Sarah Vaughan Discography at Michael Minn

Discographies of American artists
Sarah Vaughan songs
Vocal jazz discographies